Mummy Dearest conveys the story of a dedicated and committed mother who tries to stay in touch with her five (adult) children living in various cities. Her last child and only son,Chijioke is unresponsive to her efforts of staying in touch because he’s preoccupied with work,friends and fun. He is compelled to embark on a journey of self-discovery and reconciliation after his friend and colleague losses his mother to a drastic illness.

Mummy Dearest is a Nollywood movie which tells a story of a woman who has five kids who wants to keep constantly in touch with her kids and has difficulties in getting in touch with the youngest child who is her one and only son. The reason  she is not getting good quality time with her kid is because he is busy with work and friends.

References

Nigerian drama films